Taeniothrips is a genus of insects belonging to the family Thripidae.

The genus has almost cosmopolitan distribution.

Species:
 Taeniothrips amomi Priesner, 1938 
 Taeniothrips angustiglandus Han & Cui, 1992

References

Thripidae
Thrips genera